Novello is a comune (municipality) in the Province of Cuneo in the Italian region Piedmont, located about  southeast of Turin and about  northeast of Cuneo. This

Novello borders the following municipalities: Barolo, Lequio Tanaro, Monchiero, Monforte d'Alba, and Narzole.

International relations
Novello is twinned with:

 Kristinestad, Finland

References

Cities and towns in Piedmont